Maurice Orange, who was born in 1867 and died in 1916, was a French painter and artist.

Life
His youth was spent with his family and was influenced by the Franco-Prussian War. He showed an early talent for drawing and his first tutors gained him a scholarship to the École des Beaux-Arts in 1885, where he studied under Jean-Léon Gérôme and François Flameng. He was mainly inspired by historical subjects, especially the Napoleonic era, though he also produced portraits, landscapes, townscapes, and sketches, often adding drawings to his letters.

From 1887 to 1914, he took part in the Salon des Artistes Français, and won many medals and travel bursaries. Spain, Greece, Italy, Portugal, Africa, and Egypt became major influences on him. He worked in oils, watercolour, gouache, pastel, and charcoal. He died of typhoid fever in 1916.

Bibliography
Catalogue for the exhibitions at Granville by the Musée du Vieux Granville and the Musée d’art moderne Richard Anacréon (July–October 1999)

1916 deaths
1867 births
19th-century French painters
French male painters
20th-century French painters
20th-century French male artists
19th-century French male artists